Jean-Paul Paulin (1902–1976) was a French film director, producer and screenwriter.

Selected filmography

Director
 The Nude Woman (1932)
 The Abbot Constantine (1933)
 The Red Dancer (1937)
 Three from St Cyr (1939)
 The Marvelous Night (1940)
 Sybille's Night (1947)
 Folie douce (1951)

Producer
 The Red Head (1952)

References

Bibliography 
 Goble, Alan. The Complete Index to Literary Sources in Film. Walter de Gruyter, 1999.

External links 
 

1902 births
1976 deaths
20th-century French screenwriters
French film producers
Film directors from Paris